Alejandro "Álex" Baena Rodríguez (born 20 July 2001) is a Spanish professional footballer who plays as a left winger for La Liga club Villarreal.

Club career
Baena was born in Roquetas de Mar, Almería, Andalusia, and joined Villarreal CF's youth setup in 2011, from CD Roquetas. He made his senior debut with the C-team on 21 December 2018, coming on as a second-half substitute in a 2–0 Tercera División home win against UD Rayo Ibense.

Ahead of the 2019–20 season, Baena was assigned to the reserves in Segunda División B, and made his debut for the side on 14 September 2019 by starting in a 3–0 win at UE Llagostera. On 13 July of the following year, he made his first team – and La Liga – debut, replacing fellow youth graduate Manu Trigueros in a 1–2 home loss against Real Sociedad.

Baena scored his first professional goal on 5 November 2020, netting his team's third in a 4–0 UEFA Europa League home routing of Maccabi Tel Aviv FC. Seven days later, he renewed his contract until 2025.

On 19 August 2021, Baena moved to Segunda División side Girona FC on a one-year loan deal. He returned to the Yellow Submarine after being a starter in the Catalans' promotion, and scored a brace in a 3–0 away win over Real Valladolid on 13 August 2022.

On 26 August 2022, Baena and teammate Nicolas Jackson were definitely promoted to the main squad.

International career
Baena represented Spain at under-16, under-17, under-18, under-19 and under-20 levels, appearing in the 2018 UEFA European Under-17 Championship.

Career statistics

Club

Honours
Villarreal
UEFA Europa League: 2020–21

References

External links

Profile at the Villarreal CF website

2001 births
Living people
Footballers from Andalusia
Sportspeople from the Province of Almería
Spanish footballers
Association football wingers
La Liga players
Segunda División players
Segunda División B players
Tercera División players
Villarreal CF C players
Villarreal CF B players
Villarreal CF players
Girona FC players
Spain youth international footballers
Spain under-21 international footballers
UEFA Europa League winning players